The 1986 Miami Dolphins season was the team's 21st as a member of the National Football League (NFL). The Dolphins failed to improve upon their previous season's output of 12–4, winning only eight games. This was the first time in six seasons the team did not qualify for the playoffs. This was also the team's final season at the Orange Bowl before moving into their new stadium Joe Robbie Stadium the following season.

Personnel

Staff

Roster

Schedule 

Note: Intra-division opponents are in bold text.

Final roster

Season summary

Week 1 at Chargers

Week 2

Week 3 at Jets

The Jets-Dolphins rivalry reached an apex in this Week 3 matchup as Ken O'Brien and Dan Marino unleashed ten combined touchdowns, the last a 43-yard score to Wesley Walker and a 51–45 overtime win for the Jets.

Week 6 vs. Bills

Week 11 at Bills

Standings

References

External links 
 1986 Miami Dolphins at Pro-Football-Reference.com

Miami Dolphins seasons
Miami Dolphins
Miami Dolphins